The Fómeque Formation (Kif) is a geological formation of the Altiplano Cundiboyacense, Eastern Ranges of the Colombian Andes.

Etymology 
The formation was defined and named in 1957 by Hubach after Fómeque, Cundinamarca.

Description

Lithologies 
The Fómeque Formation contains high values of TOC. Fossils of  Acarthohoplites sp., Melchionites sp., Nicklesia sp., Olcostephanus sp., Pulchellia sp. have been found in the formation.

Stratigraphy and depositional environment 
The Fómeque Formation overlies the Las Juntas Formation and is overlain by the Une Formation. The age has been estimated to be Barremian to Late Aptian. Stratigraphically, the formation is time equivalent with the Mercedes Formation. The formation has been deposited in a shallow marine environment.

Outcrops 

The Fómeque Formation is apart from its type locality, found in other parts of the Eastern Ranges.

Regional correlations

See also 

 Geology of the Eastern Hills
 Geology of the Ocetá Páramo
 Geology of the Altiplano Cundiboyacense

Notes

References

Bibliography

Maps

External links 
 

Geologic formations of Colombia
Cretaceous Colombia
Lower Cretaceous Series of South America
Barremian Stage
Aptian Stage
Shale formations
Shallow marine deposits
Source rock formations
Mining in Colombia
Formations
Geography of Cundinamarca Department
Geography of Boyacá Department
Muysccubun